Max: The Curse of Brotherhood is a puzzle-platform video game developed by Press Play for Xbox One, Microsoft Windows, Xbox 360, Nintendo Switch and later on PlayStation 4. The game was announced during Microsoft's E3 2013 press event. It is a sequel to Press Play's previous work, the 2010 game Max & the Magic Marker.

Story 

Max, the protagonist of Max & the Magic Marker, arrives home from school one day and finds his younger brother Felix playing in his room and smashing his beloved toys. Being annoyed by his little brother Max searches online on the search engine website "Giggle" (a parody of Google) for a way to get rid of Felix. He immediately stumbles upon a spell which promises to make his brother disappear. Inadvertently reading the spell out loud opens up a mysterious portal from which a giant claw emerges and kidnaps his little brother Felix. Realizing the consequences of his actions, Max jumps without hesitation into the portal to rescue Felix and enters a magical and hostile world controlled by the evil lord Mustacho and his henchmen.

Gameplay 

In its core Max: The Curse of Brotherhood is a physics-based puzzle/platformer and set in a 2.5D environment with a free and cinematic camera. The game has 7 chapters and 20 levels in total. All levels are connected so the game feels like one long journey. Besides platforming, the gameplay twist is the magic marker which introduces a creative and open approach to how puzzles can be solved. Throughout the game the magic marker will gain different powers.

Reception 

Max: The Curse of Brotherhood received mixed to positive reviews, with an aggregated score of 72/100 from Metacritic.

GamesRadar praised the inventive and well-balanced puzzle design, gorgeous visuals and beautiful environments providing a fresh and charming experience on the platformer genre. Destructoid also commended its visuals which are "Pixar-esque" charming and loved the mix of cerebral puzzles combined with thrilling action sequences in a memorable world. Edge described it as a memorable and enjoyable platformer with ingenious puzzles and steady flow of new sights. But they remark that the game "stretches the controls beyond their comfort zone" and criticize the limit of freedom to draw whatever and wherever you want. GameSpot loved its lush environments and attractive art design combined with an appealing story and protagonist. Regarding the puzzles they found them initially intriguing but they tend to get repetitive and therefore predictable over the course of the game.

Game Informer wrote that the game's central conceit was a "gimmick that simply doesn't work all that well", and for that reason, they did not expect players to advance to the end of the game. They added that the Xbox One controller was not precise enough for the puzzles. They commended the final puzzle. Kotaku did not recommend the game, which they compared to a larger version of the iPhone game. They praised the game's humor and background art, but complained that the game's drawing mechanics were needlessly difficult at times and extended the game's length in undesirable ways. Hardcore Gamer criticized the game for not breaking any new ground and failing to utilize the features of the Kinect for the drawing mechanics, while praising its voice acting, sound effects and soundtrack. GameZone stated that it is hard to recommend Max: The Curse of Brotherhood to fans of platformers, since the game presents such infuriating mechanics. However, they praised the visuals, calling them, "freaking gorgeous," and commended the detailed environments, which, "coupled with the brilliant lighting make it look like an interactive Pixar movie."

References

External links 

2013 video games
Dark fantasy video games
IOS games
Microsoft games
Nintendo Switch games
PlayStation 4 games
Puzzle-platform games
Side-scrolling platform games
Video games developed in Denmark
Video games with 2.5D graphics
Video game reboots
Video game sequels
Windows games
Xbox 360 games
Xbox 360 Live Arcade games
Xbox One games
Single-player video games
Wired Productions games
Press Play (company) games
Flashbulb Games games